Second Lieutenant Douglas Euan Cameron (born 18 January 1893, date of death unknown) was a World War I flying ace credited with five victories.

Cameron was appointed a probationary temporary second lieutenant on 10 March 1918, and was confirmed in the rank on 20 May. He joined No. 1 Squadron on 19 June. He scored his first victory on 15 September, over a Pfalz D.XII fighter, and the rest of his wins over Fokker D.VII fighters, with his final two coming on 28 October 1918. He shared credit for four of his five triumphs; among the other pilots aiding him were fellow aces Charles Lavers and William Ernest Staton. He was transferred to the Unemployed List on 11 January 1919, and received a mention in despatches for his "valuable services rendered during the war" in May.

References
Notes

Bibliography
 

1893 births
Year of death missing
Royal Flying Corps officers
British World War I flying aces
Military personnel from Southampton
British Army personnel of World War I